Podsosnovo is a rural locality (a selo) in Nemetsky National District, Altai Krai, Russia. The population was 2093 as of 2016. There are 6 streets.

Geography 
Podsosnovo is located 21 km north of Galbshtadt (the district's administrative centre) by road. Kamyshi is the nearest rural locality.

Ethnicity 
The village is inhabited by Russians and Germans.

References 

Rural localities in Nemetsky National District